Newmarket State High School was a secondary school in the suburb of Newmarket in Brisbane, Queensland, Australia.  From its establishment on 29 January 1963 to its closure on 13 December 1996,  it was located on land between Banks Street and Brent Street in what is now Laurence Street, Daniel Place, Nelson Place and associated housing developments.

Principals
 K. P. O'Connor (1963-1964)
 K. Evans (1969)
 Mr. Kimmorley (1975)
 J. Mahony (1977)
 Ken Gilbert (1978)
 J. L. Shepherd (1985)
 J. Deakin (1986)
 Karyn Hart (1988)

School houses
There were four school houses: Jagara, Kabi, Waka and Yungi.  They were named for the local Aboriginal tribes thought to be living in the Newmarket and Alderley areas in the 19th century.

References

External links
 Tindale's Catalogue of Australian Aboriginal Tribes: Jagara, Kabikabi, Wakawaka

Educational institutions established in 1963
Public high schools in Brisbane
Defunct schools in Queensland
1963 establishments in Australia
Newmarket, Queensland